Parthenium is a genus of North American shrubs in the tribe Heliantheae within the family Asteraceae and subfamily Asteroideae.

The name Parthenium is an evolution of the Ancient Greek name παρθένιον (parthenion), which referred to Tanacetum parthenium.  The name is possibly derived from the Greek word παρθένος (parthenos) which means "virgin". 

Members of the genus are commonly known as feverfew. Notable species include guayule (P. argentatum) which has been used as a rubber substitute, especially during the Second World War; and also P. hysterophorus, a serious invasive species in the Old World.

Species
These include:
 Parthenium alpinum (Nutt.) Torr. & A.Gray – Arkansas River feverfew - NM CO WY
 Parthenium argentatum A.Gray – Guayule - TX, Coahuila, Guanajuato, Nuevo León, San Luis Potosí, Zacatecas
 Parthenium cineraceum Rollins -  Bolivia, Paraguay 
 Parthenium confertum A.Gray – Gray's feverfew - AZ NM TX  Chihuahua, Coahuila, Nuevo León, San Luis Potosí, Querétaro, Tamaulipas
 Parthenium fruticosum Less. - from Tamaulipas to Chiapas
 Parthenium hysterophorus L. – Santa Maria feverfew, whitetop weed - widespread in North + South America; as an invasive species in India, Australia, and Africa
 Parthenium incanum Kunth – mariola - NV UT AZ NM TX  Chihuahua, Coahuila, Durango, Hidalgo, Nuevo León, San Luis Potosí, Zacatecas
 Parthenium integrifolium L. – American feverfew, wild quinine - from TX  to MA + MN
 Parthenium ligulatum (M.E. Jones) Barneby – Colorado feverfew - CO UT 
 Parthenium rollinsianum Rzed. - San Luis Potosí
 Parthenium schottii Greenm. ex Millsp. & Chase - Yucatán
 Parthenium tomentosum DC. - Oaxaca, Puebla

Importance
In North America, the Jicarilla Apache people used Parthenium incanum for medicine (Opler 1946: 8). The sap of guayule (P. argentatum) is a source of natural rubber.
Parthenium hysterophorus is a common invasive species in India, Australia, and parts of Africa. Its pollen can cause allergies and the sap is toxic.

Gallery

References

  
 Opler, Morris E. (1946). Childhood and youth in Jicarilla Apache society. Publications of the Frederick Webb Hodge Anniversary Fund (Vol. 5). Los Angeles: The Southwest Museum Administrator of the Fund.

Further information
 

 
Asteraceae genera